The Best of Willie Nelson is a compilation album released in 1973. It contains all 12 tracks from his first two albums, And Then I Wrote, plus "Half A Man" from Here's Willie Nelson.

Release History

First released in 1973, this album was readily available throughout the 1970's. However, in 1980, a newly-revived Liberty Records reissued this album, but omitted "Darkness On The Face Of The Earth", "Three Days", and "Undo The Right". 

In 1988, this album was issued on CD for the first time by Liberty successor EMI-Manhattan Records, with all 13 tracks. However, the last two songs, "Darkness On The Face Of The Earth" and "Mr. Record Man" are presented out of order, with "Mr. Record Man" being track 12, and 
"Darkness On The Face Of The Earth" as track 13.

Track listing (1973 LP)

Track listing (1980 Liberty reissue LP)

Track listing (Compact Disc)

Personnel
Artwork By [Cover Illustration] - Peter Palombi
Design [Album] - Mike Salisbury
Photography [Cover] - John Van Hamersveld
Photography [Liner] - Jim Marshall
Producer - Joe Allison

References

1973 greatest hits albums
Willie Nelson compilation albums
Liberty Records compilation albums